al-Biyah is a Syrian village located in the Hirbnafsah Subdistrict in Hama District. According to the Syria Central Bureau of Statistics (CBS), al-Biyah had a population of 1,703 in the 2004 census. Its inhabitants are predominantly Christians.

References 

Populated places in Hama District
Christian communities in Syria